This is a list of notable people associated with patent law and patent-related institutions. For a list of notable inventors, see list of inventors. For a list of notable patent attorneys, see list of patent attorneys and agents. For a list of notable patent examiners and clerks, see patent examiner. Although this list is not intended to include inventors, patent attorneys and patent clerks, those may also be inserted in this list if they made a durable impact on patent law, or patent-related institutions.


A 

 Arrow, Kenneth (a joint winner of the Nobel Memorial Prize in Economics with John Hicks), known for Arrow information paradox, a problem that companies face when managing intellectual property across their boundaries

B 

 Banner, Don (1924–2006), former Commissioner of the United States Patent and Trademark Office (USPTO)
 Battistelli, Benoît (born 1950), former president of the European Patent Office
 van Benthem, Johannes Bob (1921–2006), first president of the European Patent Office
 Bodenhausen, Georg, former director of BIRPI and first Director General of World Intellectual Property Organization (WIPO)
 Bogsch, Árpád (1919–2004), former Director General of WIPO
 Bolkestein, Frits (born 1933), former European Commissioner for the Internal Market
 Braendli, Paul, second president of the European Patent Office
 Brimelow, Alison (born 1949), ex-Comptroller General of the United Kingdom Patent Office, fifth president of the European Patent Office

D 

 Dickinson, Q. Todd, former head of the USPTO
 Doll, John J., former acting United States Under Secretary of Commerce for Intellectual Property and director of the USPTO
 Dudas, Jon W., former head of the USPTO and U.S. Under Secretary of Commerce for Intellectual Property

G 

 Grossenbacher, Roland, former chairman of the Administrative Council of the European Patent Organisation
 Guellec, Dominique, French economist and former chief economist at the European Patent Office
 Gurry, Francis, current Director General of the WIPO
 George Washington, the signer of the first patent

H 

 Haberman, Mandy, famous British inventor of the Any-way up Cup
 Haertel, Kurt (1910–2000), considered one of the founding fathers of the European patent system

I 

 Idris, Kamil, former WIPO Director General

J 

 Jefferson, Thomas, first United States Commissioner of Patents

K 

 Kappos, David, former Director of the United States Patent and Trademark Office
 Kober, Ingo (born 1942), third president of the European Patent Office

L 

 Laddie, Sir Hugh (1946–2008), former UK judge
 Lehman, Bruce (born 1945), former U.S. Commissioner of Patents and Trademarks
 Lemelson, Jerome H. (1923–1997), controversial American inventor and patent holder, associated with submarine patents

M 

 Marchant, Ron, former Comptroller General of Patents, Trade Marks and Designs (UK), also Trade Mark Registrar, Designs Registrar and Chief Executive of the United Kingdom Patent Office, now known as the UK Intellectual Property Office.
 Markey, Howard T. (1920–2006), first chief justice of the United States Court of Appeals for the Federal Circuit
 Messerli, Peter, former Vice-President, head of the DG 3 (Appeals) of the European Patent Office (EPO)

N 

 Nakajima, Makoto, former head of Japan Patent Office
 Nies, Helen, former chief judge of United States Court of Appeals for the Federal Circuit (deceased).

O 

 Ono, Shinjiro, former Deputy commissioner of the Japan Patent Office

P 

 Phillips, Jeremy, academic and author in intellectual property law
 Pompidou, Alain (born 1942), French scientist and politician, fourth president of the European Patent Office
 van Pottelsberghe, Bruno (born 1968), chief economist at the European Patent Organisation
 Prescott, Peter QC, Patent Barrister and occasional Deputy High Court of England and Wales judge in matters relating to patents (United Kingdom)

R 

 Giles Sutherland Rich, (1904–1999) United States Judge, Court of Customs and Patent Appeals, and United States Court of Appeals for the Federal Circuit.
 Rader, Randall (born 1949), federal judge on the United States Court of Appeals for the Federal Circuit.
 Rogan, James E. (born 1957), former Under Secretary of Commerce for Intellectual Property, U.S., and former director of USPTO

S 

 Singer, Romuald, author of Singer & Stauder, The European Patent Convention – A Commentary
 Stallman, Richard, Campaigner on public interest and Free and Open Source Software.
 Stauder, Dieter, former Director of the International Section of the Centre for International Industrial Property Studies (CEIPI), author of Singer & Stauder, The European Patent Convention – A Commentary
 Stern, Richard H., academic, author on intellectual property, and former chief of Patent Section in U.S. Department of Justice
 Straus, Joseph, director of the Max Planck Institute for Intellectual Property, Competition and Tax Law and leading patent scholar
 Sugimura, Nobuchika, first chairman of the Japan Patent Attorneys Association
 Suzuki, Takashi (born 1949), Commissioner of the Japan Patent Office since July 2008

T 

 Takahashi, Korekiyo (1854–1936), first commissioner of the Japan Patent Office, then Prime Minister of Japan

See also 

 Glossary of patent law terms

References

External links and references 
 IP Hall of Fame, web site sponsored by the IAM (Intellectual Asset Management) Magazine

Patent law
People associated with patent law